The White Pass and Yukon Route railroad has had a large variety of locomotives and railroad cars.

White Pass steam locomotives
Locomotives with dark grey have been scrapped, while locomotives with light grey have been either put on display, or sold to other railroads.

White Pass gasoline-mechanical locomotives
Locomotives with dark grey have been scrapped, while locomotives with light grey have been either put on display, or sold to other railroads.

White Pass diesel-electric locomotives
Locomotives with dark grey have been scrapped, while locomotives with light grey have been either put on display, or sold to other railroads.

White Pass passenger cars
Cars with dark grey have been scrapped, while cars with light grey have been either put on display, or sold to other railroads.

Existing White Pass freight train cars
Cars with dark grey have been scrapped, while cars with light grey have been either put on display, or sold to other railroads.

Former D.&R.G., D.S.P.&P., and U.&N. cabooses
Cars with dark grey have been scrapped.

Existing White Pass work equipment
cars with light grey have been either put on display, or sold to other railroads.

Existing White Pass inspection track units
cars with light grey have been either put on display, or sold to other railroads.

Former White Pass flatcars now serving as underframes
cars with light grey have been either put on display, or sold to other railroads.

Existing White Pass car bodies detached from trucks
Car bodies with light grey have been either put on display or sold.

Former White Pass off-rail equipment on display
Equipment with light grey have been either put on display or sold.

Origins of White Pass station, passenger car, and preserved boat names

Aishihik [Cars ##264, 380] was derived from the Southern Tutchone metaphor a shè yi, which literally means its tail hanging down, and which figuratively refers to the shape of the bay at the north end of Aishihik Lake. Although Aishihik (a shè yi) is the English and Tlingit name for both the lake and the village at the north end of the lake, it is the Southern Tutchone name only for the village. The lake's name in Southern Tutchone had been Man Shӓw [Lake Big].  Aishihik Lake located 28 kilometers north of Alaska Highway Kilometer 1546, via Aishihik Lake Road. Aishihik River located at Alaska Highway Kilometer 1547.5.

Alaska [Mile Post 0 to 20.4] was derived from the Aleut idiom , which figuratively refers to mainland Alaska. Literally, it means object to which the action of the sea is directed ( [sea] +  [object of action]).

Alsek [Car #314] had been derived from the Tlingit verb theme aa łsêxh, which means a person habitually rests. It was the name of a Nóogaa (Tlingit) village located on the pre-1891 Upper Alsek River (post-1891 Tatshenshini River), near the mouth of the O'Connor River. Alsek River flows into the Gulf of Alaska.

American Shed [MP 19.2 Station] was named for a snow shed on the American side of White Pass, which existed until the 1980s.  This name distinguished this shed from a snow shed on the Canadian side of White Pass.

Annie Lake [Car #360] was named for Annie Austin (1870–1950), widow of Charles "Dawson Charlie" Henderson (co-discoverer of gold in the Klondike). Lake located 19 kilometers southwest of Robinson, via Annie Lake Road.

Atlin [Car #218 and a Barge] was derived from the Tlingit phrase áa tlein, which means large lake. Atlin Lake located 96 kilometers south of Alaska Highway Kilometer 1342, via Atlin Road.

Bare Loon Lake [Car 2nd 202] was named for skinny dipping and wailing loons. 1970s Chilkoot Trail hikers sometimes skinny dipped and sometimes heard loons wail at this lake.  This lake provided those hikers their last opportunity to bathe before returning to civilization at Bennett.  Un-officially named "Beaver Lake."  This lake is at Chilkoot Trail Kilometer 46.7 and to the west of WP&YR Mile Post 37.

Barry [Mile Post 36.0 Station] was named for Donald E. Barry (1944-2000), WP&YR conductor.  Station renamed to Vista in 2007 or 2008.

"Beaver Lake" [Car #388] is the un-official name for Bare Loon Lake, which is at Chilkoot Trail Kilometer 46.7 and to the west of WP&YR Mile Post 37.  There are at least 14 other "Beaver Lake"s in British Columbia.

Bennett [Mile Post 40.6 Station] and Bennett Lake [Car #240] were named for James Gordon Bennett, Jr. (1841–1918), son of the founder of the New York Herald.  The lake was originally one of at least four lakes which had borne the Tlingit name kusawa [narrow lake].  Bennett also located at Chilkoot Trail Kilometer 53.1.

Bernard Lake [Car 2nd 209] was named for J. Bernard "Ben" Moore (1865-1919), who helped establish the White Pass Trail.  Un-officially named "Fraser Lake."  Lake located at Mile Post 27.7 and at Klondike Highway Kilometer 36.5, adjacent to the Fraser station.

Big Kalzas Lake [Car 2nd 230] was named for Kalzas (fl. 1859), a Northern Tutchone employee of the Hudson's Bay Co.

Big Salmon Lake [Cars ##276, 352] was named for the Big Salmon River, which flows through the lake. Big Salmon River took its name from its Tagish, Tlingit, and Northern Tutchone names, which translate to water in which there is large chinook (king) salmon.  Big Salmon River begins at Quiet Lake, at South Canol Road Kilometer 98.5. Big Salmon Lake is 9 kilometers downstream.

Black Cross Rock [Mile Post 10.4 Station] is a large fallen rock with grave marker, which commemorates two construction workers who were accidentally crushed and buried by this rock on August 10, 1898. This accident occurred during blasting operations. One of the workers was Maurice Dunn (1861-1898), who had lived in Michigan and California. The other worker is "supposed to be", "A. Jeneaux," but there is little corroboration for that latter name.

Black Lake [Car #216] was named for the lake's dark appearance, which is caused by the presence of tannic acid and by the lake's not being fed by glacial runoff. Lake located on the Klondike Highway between Mile 4 and Mile 5.

Boulder [Mile Post 4.5 Station] was named for boulders located in the Skagway River at this location.

British Columbia [MP 20.4 to MP 52.6] was indirectly named for Christopher Columbus (1451-1506), by way of five iterations. British Columbia was immediately named in 1858 for the portion of the Columbia District which lies in Canada. The Columbia District was a fur trading district, which was immediately named about 1810 for the Columbia River, which drains the district. The Columbia River was immediately named in 1792 for the privately owned ship Columbia Rediviva, which entered the river in that year. "Columbia" in the ship's name was an immediate 1773 reference to the New World. Finally, this particular reference to the New World had been derived from the name of Christopher Columbus.

Canyon [former Mile Post 106.0 Station] is named for Miles Canyon, to which it is adjacent. Miles canyon is named for Lt. Gen. Nelson A. Miles, who sent 1Lt. Frederick G. Schwatka on his journey along the Yukon River in 1883.

Carcross [Mile Post 67.5 Station] was shortened from Caribou Crossing to Carcross in 1904, because of frequent confusion in mail services. Named Caribou Crossing from 1900 to 1904.  Prior to 1900, the name Caribou Crossing had applied to where most caribou actually crossed – the narrows at Ten Mile Point, which is located three miles east of present-day Carcross, and which divides Nares Lake from Tagish Lake. The Tagish name for these narrows was Médzíh É’oł [Caribou are Swimming], and the Tlingit name for these narrows was Watsíx Naakwaaní Yé [Caribou Swimming Route]. The name Caribou Crossing was moved from Ten Mile Point to present-day Carcross in 1900, when the railroad arrived and appropriated the name. Prior to 1900, present-day Carcross had been  Upper Caribou Crossing. The Tagish name for Upper Caribou Crossing (present-day Carcross) had been Todezáané [Sand Always Blowing]. The Tlingit name for Upper Caribou Crossing had been Naadaashaa Héeni [“Stream Flowing from the Mountain,” referring to present-day Tincup Creek].  Carcross also located at Klondike Highway Kilometer 105.6.

Carr-Glynn [former Copper Branch station, 5.2 rail miles from MacRae] was named for Sir Sidney Carr Glynn (1835-1916), first chairman of the WP&YR. Site located at the south end of Carr-Glynn Lake, 12 kilometers south of Alaska Highway Kilometer 1428.3: three kilometers via Fish Lake Road, plus 9 kilometers via Copper Haul Road.

Chilkat [Car 2nd 205] is a Tlingit name of unknown origin, but it looks like an abbreviation of a phrase which means river that brings the storehouse(s) sockeye salmon. In 1882, the Chilkat River’s name was reported to be "Tschilkat-hīn," or Chíl [storehouse] Gaat [sockeye salmon] Héen [river].  Standing alone, Chíl Gaat Héen is not a complete phrase, because it contains only three alienable nouns that are not grammatically linked.  In addition, Chíl Gaat Héen does not appear to be an Eyak loanword, because the Eyak language was too far away, and héen is not an Eyak word. The simplest way to link the nouns, and to complete a phrase, would have been to add a verb at the end. (The Tlingit declarative phrase sequence is: indirect object, then direct object, then subject, followed by the verb.)  The logical verb would have been yaa na-ø-tee-n [brings].  Thus, the most likely complete phrase would have been chíl-de gaat héen yaa na-tee-n, which means river that brings the storehouse(s) sockeye salmon. Indeed, that reconstructed phrase accurately describes the Chilkat River!  Moreover, that phrase also explains why "Chilkat" had not been the Tlingit name for Chilkat Lake. Chilkat Lake’s Tlingit name had been Áa Ká [Surface of the Lake].  The U.S. Navy officially assigned the name Chilkat to the lake in 1880. Chilkat River extends sinuously between Haines Highway Miles 4.3 and 23.8. Chilkat Lake located six miles south of Haines Highway Mile 26.2, four miles via the Chilkat Lake Road, and two miles via shallow rivers (on jetboat or snowmobile).

Chilkoot [Car 2nd 204] was derived from the Tlingit phrase chál-góot, which means without a storehouse. This name was a reference to the Chilkoot Indians' having stored fish packed in snow between alder or willow branches, instead of in storehouses.  Chilkoot Lake located 10 miles north of Haines: 9 miles via Lutak Road and 1 mile via Chilkoot Lake Road.

Chilkoot Trail is a partial translation of the trail’s Tlingit name, namely Chilkoot Dei-yi (\dā•yee\), which means Chilkoot-owned Trail. The trail’s English name omits the reference to ownership.  The trail extends 33.0 miles/53.1 kilometers, from Dyea Road Mile 7.2 to Bennett Station.  The second word of Chilkoot Dei-yi sounds like the un-corrupted name for the village of Dyea (the English corruption = \dī•yee\). Prior publications state that the name Dyea was derived from the words for “to pack” [yaa] or “carrying place” [yaa yé].  However, the presence of the initial \d\ sound in Dyea casts doubt on those latter possibilities, and suggests that the first syllable was in fact dei (as in dei-yi). Use of the name Dyea for its present location first occurred in 1886, when John J. Healy (1840-1908) and Edgar Wilson (1842-1895) opened a trading post there.  (Note the distinction between the Tlingit possessed noun Dei-yi [Owned Trail], and the Tlingit phrase Dei Yé [Way to the Trail]. This distinction is reflected in the difference between the English names Dyea and Taiya (inlet name, river name). See, Taiya, below.)

Choutla [Car #366] was derived from the Southern Tutchone idiom chu dläw, which figuratively refers to the waterfalls that feed Choutla Lake. Literally, it means laughing water.  This name was coined in 1911 by Bishop Isaac O Stringer as the name for a nearby school.  Choutla Lake located six kilometers east of Klondike Highway Kilometer 65.7, via Tagish Road.

Clifton [Mile Post 8.5 Station] was named for the rock ledge overhanging the tracks at this location.

Combo [Car #211] is an abbreviation for combined passenger and baggage car.

Copper River [Car #304] was named for abundant copper deposits along the upper river. River flows along portions of the Glenn Highway, Richardson Highway, Edgerton Highway, and Copper River Highway.

Cougar Lake [Car #506] was the name of Cowley Lake until sometime between 1941 & 1947. Lake located at former Mile Post 94.7.

Cowley [former Mile Post 95.1 Station] and Cowley Lake [Car #234] were named for Isaac Cowley Lambert (1850–1909), chairman of the construction company which built the WP&YR railroad.  Lake named Cougar Lake until sometime between 1941 & 1947.  Cowley Station access road at Klondike Highway kilometer 148.1.  Cowley Lake located at former Mile Post 94.7.

Crag Lake [Car #362] was named for the crag which overlooks the lake. Lake located 13 kilometers east of Klondike Highway Kilometer 65.7, via Tagish Road.

Crater Lake [Car 3rd 201] was named for the lake's crater-like appearance. Lake extends between Chilkoot Trail Kilometers 26 and 28.

De Wette [former Mile Post 84.0 Station] was named for Auguste C. R. de Wette (1845-1912), banker and early shareholder of the WP&YR.  Station had been named Wette Lea until 1901.

Dease Lake [Cars ##280, 503] was named for Peter Warren Dease (1788–1863), chief factor of the Hudson's Bay Co.  Lake located 226 kilometers south of Alaska Highway Kilometer 1002, via Cassiar Highway.

Denver [Mile Post 5.9 Station] was named in 1904 for the four-mile distant Denver Glacier.  Until that year, the station had been named Viaduct.  The Denver Glacier had been named in 1899 or 1900 for Denver, Colorado, by two former Denver residents, WP&YR civil engineer Alfred Williams and company photographer Harry C. Barley.

Dewey Lake [Car #220] most likely named for Adm. George Dewey (1837–1917), U.S. Navy.  Lake located  mile east of Skagway, via steep hiking trail.

Dezadeash [Car #254] was derived from the Tlingit phrase dáas’aa kayáash, which means snare platforms (for fishing).  Dezadeash Lake extends between Haines Highway kilometers 193 and 210.

Divide [Mile Post 21.1 Station] is the loop track switch, just north of White Pass. May have been named for the drainage divide between the Skagway River and Yukon River drainage basins, the actual divide being about a mile south of this point.

Drury Lake [Car #336] was named for William S. Drury (1870–1953) of Taylor & Drury, Yukon merchants.

Dugdale [former Mile Post 99.9 Station] was named for James Dugdale (1842-1903), an early White Pass shareholder. Dugdale not to be confused with Dundalk, below.

Dundalk [Mile Post 56.3 Station] most likely named by Michael J. Heney for the port city 57 miles east of Killeshandra, Ireland. Heney's parents had emigrated from Killeshandra to Canada in 1854, probably via Dundalk. The parents were Thomas Heney (1832-1892) and Mary Ann (McCourt) Heney (1834-1911). Dundalk not to be confused with Dugdale, above.

Ear Lake [former Mile Post 107.2 Station] was named for the shape of the adjacent lake.

Emerald Lake [Cars ##244, 254, 501] was named for the blue and green light from the surrounding trees that is reflected by the lake's marl bed. Lake located at Klondike Highway kilometer 117.6.

Fairweather Lake [Cars ##278, 356] is a Yukon Lake, which looks like it was so named because fair weather usually occurs at this lake. If so, this phenomenon is attributable to the polar easterlies' prevailing at the lake's latitude (63° 13' N).

Fantail Lake [Car 2nd 203] was named for the fantail hitch, which is a dogsled hitch in which there is a separate tug line connecting each dog to the sled. The dogs are thereby fanned out in front of the sled. Also known as a fan hitch.  The fantail hitch is less common than the gangline (or tandem) hitch, in which a common tug line runs between two tandems of dogs, and each dog is connected to that common tug line. The ice on Fantail Lake constituted part of the Fantail Trail, the winter dogsled trail that extended between Log Cabin and Atlin, British Columbia. The lake extends from 20 to 29 miles east of Log Cabin, via the trail.

Finlayson Lake [Car #340] was named for Duncan Finlayson (1796–1862), chief factor of the Hudson's Bay Co.  Lake located 231 kilometers north of Alaska Highway Kilometer 980, via Campbell Highway.

Fortymile River [Car #322] was so named because it joins the Yukon River 40 miles below (west-northwest of) Old Fort Reliance. Fortymile River located 48 kilometers north of Top of the World Highway Kilometer 59.2, via Clinton Creek Road.

Fox Lake [Car #390] is presumably named for the red fox, which is found throughout the Yukon.  Lake received the name Fox by 1940, when a landing field was built near the lake's location, but before a highway was there. The lake's previous Southern Tutchone name had been Kwätan'aya Mân [Going-Into-the-Bush Lake]. The lake now extends between Klondike Highway kilometers 238 and 248.

Foy [Mile Post 11.4 Station] was named for Hugh Foy (1842-1899), White Pass Superintendent of Construction.

Frances Lake [Car #364] was named for Lady Frances Simpson (1812–1853), wife of Hudson's Bay Co. governor, George Simpson. Lake located 171 kilometers north of Alaska Highway Kilometer 980, via Campbell Highway.

Fraser [Mile Post 27.7 Station] was named for Duncan C. Fraser (1845-1910), a Member of Parliament from Nova Scotia. Fraser also located at Klondike Highway kilometer 36.5.

"Fraser Lake" [Cars 1st 200, #226] is the unofficial name for Bernard Lake.  Lake located at Mile Post 27.7 and at Klondike Highway kilometer 36.5, adjacent to the Fraser station. A larger and more famous lake in British Columbia is officially named Fraser Lake.

Gateway [Mile Post 23.5 Station] was probably named for the WP&YR slogan "Gateway to the Yukon," and for the fact that this location has the highest elevation on entire White Pass railroad, at 2940 feet.

Glacier [Mile Post 14.1 Station] was named for groundwater seepage and freezing at this location.  In the early 1900s, this phenomenon was also referred to as a glacier.

Goat Lake [Car #386] is named for the high concentration of mountain goats in the area. Lake is 1921 feet above, and supplies the water for, Pitchfork Falls at Mile Post 9.5.

Gravel Pit [Mile Post 55.6 Station] was named for an adjacent gravel pit.

Graves [Mile Post 49.3 Station] and Samuel H. Graves [Car #402] were named for Samuel H. Graves (1852-1911), the first president of WP&YR. In 1885, Graves had become an associate of Close Brothers, the firm that later financed the WP&YR. Graves station renamed to Scheffler in 2016.

Guardrail Curve [Mile Post 43.6 Station] was named for the 24° curve, sharpest on the railroad, which until the 1970s, had a third, safety rail – a.k.a., a guardrail.

Gulch [Mile Post 18.3 Station] was named for the confluence of Dead Horse Gulch and Switchback Gulch.  See, Skagway River Branches, below.

Hannan [former Mile Post 17.6 Snow Shed] was named for Kenneth B. Hannan (1889-1976), White Pass General Manager in 1949, when the snow shed was erected. Shed removed in 1992. Site renamed to Hawkins in 2019.

Hawkins [Mile Post 17.6 Station] was named for Erastus C. Hawkins (1860-1912), chief engineer for construction of the White Pass railway. The two flatcars near the bottom of the hillside at this location are former WP&YR ##483 and 1015, carried down in a 1977 snowslide. Site named Hannan until 2019.

Heney [former Mile Post 12.3 Station] and Michael J. Heney [Car #401] were named for Michael J. Heney (1864-1910), the labor contractor who built the WP&YR railroad. Heney station was eliminated in 2019.

Homan Lake [Car 2nd 208] was named for Charles A. Homan (1847–1918), U.S. Army topographer who accompanied 1Lt. Frederick G. Schwatka along the Yukon River in 1883.

Hutshi [Car #358] was derived from the Tlingit phrase hóoch’ áayi, which means last lake. Hutshi Lake was so named because it was the northern-most lake on three Chilkat trade routes, the Neskatahin Trail, the Chilkat Glacier Trail, and the Silver Lake Trail.  Hutshi Lake located 48 kilometers north of Champagne (Alaska Highway Kilometer 1513), via the Neskatahin Trail.

Inspiration Point [Mile Post 16.9 Station] was named for the vista seen from this location.

Jennings Lake [Car #374] was named for William T. Jennings (1846–1906), civil engineer who assessed various railroad and road routes to the Yukon.

Johns Lake [Car #332] was named for Johnny Johns (1898-1988), Carcross-based outfitter and guide.

Kathleen Lake [Car #270] was named for a girl in Berwickshire County, Scotland, left behind by William "Scotty" Hume (1868–1950), a North-West Mounted Police constable (Reg. #2259) stationed on the Dalton Trail from 1898 to 1903. Lake located  kilometer west of Haines Highway Kilometer 219.7, via Kathleen Lake Turnoff.

Keno [Steam-Stern Wheel Boat] was ultimately derived from a French term which means five winning numbers; a game of chance.  The boat was immediately named for the Keno (silver) claim, staked in 1919 by Alfred Kirk Schellinger. Keno claim located 110 kilometers east of Klondike Highway Kilometer 535, via Silver Trail.

Klehini [there should be a car so named!] was derived from the Tlingit phrase l’éiw héeni, which means gravel river. Gravel is in abundance in the Klehini River and Valley. River extends sinuously between Haines Highway Mile 23.8 and Kilometer 87 (corresponding to Mile 50).

Klondike [Car #308 and Steam-Stern Wheel Boat] was derived from the Hän idiom Tr'o Ndek, which figuratively means Hammer River. Literally, it means Chinook (King) Salmon River. The reason for the figurative meaning is that hammers had been used to erect barriers in the Klondike River, in order to catch the Chinook salmon.  Klondike River extends sinuously between Klondike Highway kilometers 664 and 715.

Kluahne [Car #504] was an early spelling of Kluane.

Kluane [Car #258] was derived from the hybrid phrase lhù aani, which means whitefish place.  It consists of the Southern Tutchone word for whitefish, plus the Tlingit word for place in which there are.  Kluane Lake extends between Alaska Highway kilometers 1642 and 1701.

Klukshu [Cars ##282, 348] was derived from the Tlingit phrase l’ook shù, which means end of coho salmon.  Klukshu Lake located  kilometer east of Haines Highway Kilometer 183.2, via Klukshu Turnoff.

Kusawa [Car #286] was derived from the Tlingit phrase ká-woo-sáa-oo áa, which means narrow lake.  Because retreating glaciers often leave long and narrow lakes, there are at least four lakes which had borne this Tlingit name, including Kusawa Lake, Yukon, for which the coach is named. Kusawa Lake, Yukon, located 24 kilometers south of Alaska Highway kilometer 1489.1, via Kusawa Lake Road.

LaBerge Lake [Car #256] was named for Michael Laberge (1837-1909), a Yukon River explorer who never actually saw the lake named for him. Lake located 3 kilometers east of Klondike Highway Kilometer 225, via Deep Creek Road.

Lansdowne [former Mile Post 74.9 Station] was named for Henry C. K. P. Fitz-Maurice, 5th Marquess of Lansdowne (1845-1927), Governor-General of Canada, 1883-1888.

"LeBarge Lake" [Car #256] is a misspelling of Laberge Lake.

"Lewes Lake" [Car #268] misspells the surname of Alfred B. Lewis (1866-1928), chief locating engineer of the WP&YR, for whom the lake was named. Lake located at former Mile Post 83.

Liard [Car #316] is the French word for eastern cottonwood.  Liard River extends sinuously between Alaska Highway kilometers 761 and 991.

Lindeman Lake [Car #222] was named for Dr. Moritz K. A. Lindeman (1823–1908), secretary to the Bremen Geographical Society. Lake extends between Chilkoot Trail kilometers 41 and 52.

Log Cabin [Mile Post 33.0 Station] was named for a structure which had been erected by the Tagish Indians. The name "Log Cabin," and an actual log cabin, predated any Canadian government structure at this location.

Lorne [former Mile Post 79.4 Station] was named for John D. S. Campbell, Marquess of Lorne (1845-1914), Governor-General of Canada, 1878-1883.

Lynx Lake [Car #501] has an unknown eponym. Possibly, a fantasy name.

Mackenzie River [Car #310] was named for Sir Alexander Mackenzie (1764–1820), Arctic explorer. River located 607 kilometers north of Klondike Highway Kilometer 675, via Dempster Highway.

MacRae [former Mile Post 104.0 Station] was named for Charles Colin MacRae (1843-1922), an early White Pass shareholder. MacRae also located at Alaska Highway kilometer 1413.1.

Marsh Lake [Car #224] was named for Prof. Othniel C. Marsh (1831–1899), of Yale University. The Tagish name for Marsh Lake had been Taa-gish Áayi [lake consisting of breakup water]. Lake extends between Alaska Highway kilometers 1367 and 1379.

Mayo Lake [Car #236] was named for Alfred H. Mayo (1846–1923), a Yukon trader. Lake located 95 kilometers east of Klondike Highway Kilometer 535, via Silver Trail.

McClintock Lake [Cars ##288, 350] was named for Adm. Sir Francis L. McClintock (1819–1907), an Arctic explorer.

McConnell Lake [Car #372] was named for Charles McConnell (1871–1946), postmaster at Robinson. Lake located 3 kilometers west of Robinson, via Annie Lake Road.

McDonald Creek [Mile Post 62.9 Station] had been named for a person who allegedly staked a claim at this location in 1899. Twenty-one subsequent claims were filed for this same creek in the same year. No gold was found here.  Apparently, a hoax.

McNeil Lake [Car #342] is named for the McNeil River, which flows through the lake. McNeil River was named in 1951.  It looks like the river was named for James H. McNeil (1871-1951), Yukon Superintendent of Public Roads and Buildings, 1917-1945.  He had been the most prominent Yukon official associated with construction of the Alaska Highway. In 1940, he was appointed to the U.S.-Canada Permanent Joint Board on Defense, relating to the then-proposed Alaska Highway. The river's previous Tlingit name had been Kéidladi Héeni [Seagull River]. The head of the McNeil River is 12 miles upstream from the lake, and is technically the "source" of the Yukon River. The source of a river is the most distant point upstream from the mouth of the river, regardless of assigned name.

McQuesten Lake [Car #338] was named for LeRoy N. "Jack" McQuesten (1836–1909), Yukon trader. Lake located 15 kilometers north of Silver Trail Kilometer 63, via a side road.

Meadows [Mile Post 25.4 Station] was named for the meadows along the Tutshi River (a.k.a. "Thompson River") at this location. Presumably, the 1899 stable at the south (uphill) end of the Thompson River meadows was so located so that horses could feed on the grass of these meadows.

Minto [former Mile Post 81.6 Station] was named for Gilbert J. Elliott-Murray-Kynynmound, 4th Earl of Minto (1845-1914), Governor-General of Canada, 1898-1904.

Moose Lake [Car #504] is the name of multiple lakes in the Yukon and northwest British Columbia. All apparently named for the animal. The most prominent such lake is at Alaska Highway Kilometer 1828.5, across the road from an archeological site.

Morrow Lake [Car 2nd 207] was named for William Richard Morrow (1915–1968), Yukon corrections director, who proposed that convicts maintain the Chilkoot Trail. Lake located at Chilkoot Trail kilometer 30.7.

Muncho [Car #252] was derived from the Kaska phrase men cho, which means big lake.  Muncho Lake extends between Alaska Highway kilometers 698.5 and 710.

Munroe Lake [Car #344] was named for Alexander Munro (1857-1909), boundary survey axe man who broke his leg near this lake in 1901.

Nakina [Car #382] was derived from the Tlingit village name , which means People Sitting Upstream.

Nares Lake [Car 2nd 206] was named for Adm. Sir George S. Nares (1831–1915), an Arctic explorer. Lake located at Klondike Highway kilometer 105.2

Neecheah [Diesel-Screw Propeller Boat] was derived from the Tlingit phrase neech yeil’, which means calm shoreline. This name looks like a Tlingit language description of the Yukon River just downstream of Whitehorse Rapids, which is grammatically correct, but does not pre-date 1900.  Prior to October 1899, Whitehorse itself had not existed, and there had been no reason for the Indians to give its future location a name. Neecheah [Neech Yeil’] appears to be a short Tlingit language description of Whitehorse that was created in 1922 to name the boat.

Neskatahin [there should be a car so named!] is a contraction of the Tlingit phrase Nás’k Áa Tayee Héen, which means Where the River is Below Three Lakes.   This name refers to a village located at a bend in the present-day Tatshenshini River, which is about 500 feet below, and about 3½ miles from, three nearby lakes – Pringle Lake, Stella Lake, and Neskatahin Lake.  These three lakes lie on plateaus which overlook the river bend.  Neskatahin was also 114 miles from Haines, via the Neskatahin Trail.

Nisutlin [Car #272] was a loanword used by the Tagish Indians. Its origin had been neither Tagish nor Tlingit. (The original Tlingit name for the Nisutlin River had been Héen Tlein [Big River].) The name Nisutlin was borrowed from a Southern Tutchone phrase which means strong flow. Nisutlin Bay located at Alaska Highway kilometer 1243.

Norcom [Steam-Stern Wheel Boat] was named for the Northern Commercial Co., an affiliate of the Northern Navigation Co.

"Norse River" [Car #306] was a misspelling of Nourse River, which had been named for Prof. Joseph E. Nourse (1819-1889), U.S. Navy. River mouth located at Chilkoot Trail Mile 7.2.

Octopus Lake [Car #507] is a metaphoric name, which refers to the lake’s "many arms." Sounds like the translation from a Tlingit metaphoric name. Octopus Lake is just east of Summit Lake at White Pass. Its surface elevation is 15 feet above Summit Lake's.  Octopus Lake extends between Mile Post 21.2 (Divide) and Mile Post 22.5.

Partridge Lake [Car #505] was named for Otto H. “Swampy” Partridge (1855-1930), who constructed three small steamboats near this lake in 1898 (Flora, Ora, and Nora).

Pavey [Mile Post 46.4 Station] was named for Francis Pavy (1837-1902), an associate of Charles Colin MacRae, both investors in the WP&YR.

Peace River [Car #330] was named for the peace treaty made in 1781 along the shores of this river, near its mouth (near Peace Point, Alberta). This treaty settled a territorial war between the Cree and Dane-zaa (Beaver) Indians. River located at Alaska Highway kilometer 55.4.

Peel River [Car #326] was named for Sir Robert Peel (1788–1850), prime minister of Great Britain. River located 539 kilometers north of Klondike Highway Kilometer 675, via Dempster Highway.

Pelly Lake [Car #346] was named for Sir John H. Pelly (1777–1852), governor of the Hudson's Bay Co.

Pelly River [Car #320] was named for Sir John H. Pelly (1777–1852), governor of the Hudson's Bay Co. River located at Klondike Highway kilometer 463.6.

Pennington [Mile Post 51.6 Station] was named for Frederick Pennington (1819-1914), an early shareholder of the WP&YR.

Pit [Mile Post 55.6 Station]. See, Gravel Pit, above.

Porcupine River [Car #324] is presumably named for the North American porcupine, which is found in the region. River received the name Porcupine by 1898. River located at Klondike Highway Mile 6, and across the Skagway River from WP&YR Mile Post 7.3.

"Portage Lake" [Car #267] is the un-official name for the lake at WP&YR Mile Post 30.5, just north (downstream) of Shallow Lake and just south (uphill) of Maud Lake.  Originally, Áak'u Sáani (Little Lakes in Tlingit).  Then, un-officially "Shallow Lake," until 1899, when Shallow became the official name for the lake just to the south (upstream). Lake also located at Klondike Highway kilometer 41.1.

Primrose Lake [Car #274] was named for Supt. Philip C. H. Primrose (1864–1937), North-West Mounted Police (Reg. #O.56).

Ptarmigan Point [Mile Post 29.9 Station] was named for the Alaska state bird. (Or, co-state bird, if you count the mosquito. 😁) Ptarmigan was derived from the Scottish Gaelic tārmachan. The "p" was added in 1684 to make the word appear to be Greek!!

Pueblo [former Copper Branch terminal, 11.0 rail miles from MacRae] was so named by Hibbard E. Porter (1860-1916), who staked a copper claim at this site in 1899. Site located at intersection of Fish Lake Road and Copper Haul Road, 3 kilometers southwest of Alaska Highway kilometer 1428.3, via Fish Lake Road.

Racine Lake [Car #384] was named for Cariste Racine (1851-1926), owner of a sawmill on Tagish Lake, and owner of the White Pass Hotel in Whitehorse.

Rapid Spur [former Mile Post 109.0 Station] was named for the adjacent White Horse Rapids. On March 27, 1900, ten weeks before the railroad reached this point, Mr. Cornelius Curtin (1855-1900) had died of pneumonia at White Horse Rapids. His attending physician had been Dr. Leonard S. E. Sugden.  Dr. Sugden then transported Mr. Curtin's body to Tagish, where he cremated it in the firebox of the steamer Olive May. Dr. Sugden's subsequent recount of this peculiar event to Robert W. Service led to the fanciful poem The Cremation of Sam McGee.

Red Line [Car #5] was named for the stage and boat line which operated between White Pass, British Columbia, and Carcross, Yukon, from 1898 to 1901.

Robinson [former Mile Post 88.9 Station] was named for William C. "Stikine Bill" Robinson (1857-1926), general foreman of construction of the White Pass railroad. Robinson also located at Klondike Highway kilometer 139.6.

Rocky Point [Mile Post 6.9 Station] was named for the large rock outcropping at this location, through which the railroad cut had been made.

Scheffler [Mile Post 49.3 Station] was named for Willi Scheffler, White Pass Roadmaster. Station was named Graves until 2016.

Schwatka Lake [Car #266] was named for 1Lt. Frederick G. Schwatka (1849–1892), 3rd U.S. Cavalry, Yukon explorer. In 1876, Lt. Schwatka had led the initial cavalry charge at the Battle of Slim Buttes. Schwatka Lake was created by a dam in 1958 and is located at former Mile Post 107.7.

Sibilla [Gasoline-Screw Propeller Boat] had been the name of the yacht on which the financier of the White Pass, namely William B. Close, spent much of his youth.

Skagway [Mile Post 0.0 Station] and Skagway River [Car #300] were derived from sha-ka-ԍéi, a Tlingit idiom which figuratively refers to rough seas in the Taiya Inlet, that are caused by strong north winds. Literally, skagway is a gerund which means pretty woman.  The story behind the name is that Skagway [“Pretty Woman”] was the nickname of Kanagoo, a mythical woman who transformed herself into stone at Skagway bay and who (according to the story) now causes the strong, channeled winds which blow toward Haines, Alaska. The rough seas caused by these winds have therefore been referred to by using Kanagoo's nickname, Skagway. The Kanagoo stone formation is now known as Face Mountain, which is seen from Skagway bay. The Tlingit name for Face Mountain is Kanagoo Yahaayí [Kanagoo's Image/Soul]. (North winds prevail at Skagway from November to March. South winds prevail from April to October.) Skagway also located at Klondike Highway Mile 0. Skagway River bridges at Klondike Highway Mile 1.8 and WP&YR Mile Post 14.2.

Skagway River Branches:
East Fork: The East Fork branches off the Skagway River, opposite Mile Post 4.8. From there, the railroad follows the East Fork to Mile Post 5.8, where it makes a U-turn, crosses the East Fork, and loops back to follow the main river.
White Pass Fork: The Skagway River turns to the east, and White Pass Fork branches off to the north, opposite Mile Post 12. From there, the railroad follows the Skagway River to Mile Post 14.2, where it makes a U-turn, crosses the Skagway River, and loops back to follow White Pass Fork.
Switchback Gulch: Switchback Gulch branches to the east, and Dead Horse Gulch branches to the north, opposite Mile Post 18. From there, the railroad follows Switchback Gulch to Mile Post 18.6, where it makes a left turn and crosses Switchback Gulch.
Dead Horse Gulch: After crossing Switchback Gulch, the railroad goes through a tunnel which comes out along Dead Horse Gulch. From there, the railroad follows Dead Horse Gulch to its head at Pump House Lake, at Mile Post 20.

Slippery Rock [MP 15.6 Station] was named for the 50° to 60° rock slope adjacent to the track, from which snow and ice slide onto the tracks during the winter and spring.

Spirit Lake [Car #214] was named for the spirit of the Yukon, by U.S. Army troops during construction of the Alaska Highway in 1942. Lake located at Klondike Highway kilometer 116.

Squanga [Car #376] was derived from dasgwaanga, the Tagish and Tlingit name for "humpback" or lake whitefish. Ironically, Squanga Lake also contains whitefish now known as "Squanga whitefish," which are a different species from the lake [humpback] whitefish which gave this lake its name. Squanga Lake located at Alaska Highway kilometer 1315.9.

Stewart River [Car #328] was named for James G. Stewart (1825–1881), who discovered this river in 1849. River extends sinuously between Klondike Highway kilometers 535 and 594.

Stikine [Car #306] was derived from the Tlingit idiom sh táax’ héen, which figuratively refers to whirlpools and eddies found in the Stikine River. Literally, it means river water biting itself.  River located 286 kilometers south of Alaska Highway Kilometer 1002, via Cassiar Highway.

Summit Lake [Cars 2nd 200, #262] was named for the White Pass summit.  Lake located at Mile Post 21, just north of the White Pass summit.

Surprise Lake [Car #370] so named in 1898 by prospectors Kenneth C. McLaren and Frederick "Fritz" Miller.  Previously, it had been one of at least four lakes which had borne the Tlingit name kusawa [narrow lake]. Surprise Lake located 18 kilometers east of Atlin, via Surprise Lake Road.

Switchback [former Mile Post 18.7 station] was named for the railroad switchback on the original, 1898-1901 alignment across Switchback Gulch (see, Skagway River Branches, above). The original alignment also included the first Bridge 18-A on the lower switchback leg, and Bridge 18-B crossing the Gulch on the upper switchback leg, both bridges close to the switchback switch. From 1901 to 1969, the second Bridge 18-A ("Steel Bridge") crossed Switchback Gulch at Mile Post 18.3 and bypassed both legs and bridges of the original switchback. Since 1969, most of the south leg of the original switchback, plus the third Bridge 18-A across Switchback Gulch (at Mile Post 18.6), plus a tunnel have, in turn, bypassed the second Bridge 18-A.

Tagish [Car #248] was derived from the Tagish phrase taa-gish, which means breakup of ice. This name refers to the sound that the Tagish River ice makes during spring breakup.  The Tagish Indians adopted this name to identify themselves because, prior to 1898, they spent their winters along the Tagish River.  The Tagish name for present-day Tagish Lake was Taku because the lake provided access to the Taku Tlingit people. Conversely, the Tlingit (and consequently English) name for present-day Tagish Lake is Tagish because the lake provided access to the Tagish people. Tagish Lake extends between Klondike Highway kilometers 78 and 95.

Taiya (\tī•ye\) [Car #302] is the English corruption of the Tlingit name Dei Yé (\dā ye\), which means Way to the Trail. A 1973 publication states that Taiya “purportedly” was derived from the words for “carrying place” [yaa yé].  However, the presence of the initial \t\ or \d\ sound in Taiya or \Deyah\ casts doubt on the yaa yé [carrying place] possibility, and suggests that the first syllable was in fact dei (as in dei yé). In usage, Dei Yé – standing alone – was the Tlingit name for the combination of the present-day Taiya Inlet – plus the eight-mile, canoe-navigable portion of the present-day Taiya River, which ends at the mouth of the Nourse River.  Other than Yé [Way], there was no word in the original name which would correspond to an inlet or river.  Thus, the name Dei Yé referred to the Way to the Chilkoot Trail, from the south end of the Taiya Inlet, to the north end of canoe navigation on the Taiya River. North of the Nourse River, the present-day Taiya River was named Sít’ Yayík [Noisy Glacier].  (Note the distinction between the Tlingit possessed noun Dei-yi [Owned Trail], and the Tlingit phrase Dei Yé [Way to the Trail]. This distinction is reflected in the difference between the English names Dyea (village name) and Taiya.  See, Chilkoot Trail, above.)  Taiya River located at Dyea Road Mile 7.3.

Takhini [Cars ##284, 354] was derived from the Tlingit metaphor téix héeni, which literally means broth, and figuratively refers to Takhini Hot Springs. Takhini River located at Alaska Highway kilometer 1468.9, and at Klondike Highway kilometer 195.5.

Taku [Car #318] is a contraction of the Tlingit phrase t’aawák galakú, which means a flood of Canada geese.  Taku River flows into the Taku Inlet, 18 miles northeast of Juneau.

"Tarahne" [Gasoline-Screw Propeller Boat] was directly derived from Tarahini, which was the name of a little creek at Atlin. The name Tarahini was suggested to the ship's carpenter by Chief Taku Jack (John Taku, Sr.). Previously, Tarahini had been derived from the Tlingit phrase té yaa .aa hini, which means stream sitting along rock. Tarahini had been derived by eliminating yaa and by substituting the English \ra\ sound for the Tlingit aspirated \.aa\ sound. Thus, all vocal sounds in Tarahini occur in English. The reason for the subsequent change from Tarahini to "Tarahne" is not known.

Tatshenshini [Car #312] was derived from the Tlingit phrase t’á chaan sha-héeni, which means river with stinking chinook (king) salmon at its headwaters. This name refers to the dead, spawned-out salmon at the headwaters of the pre-1891 Tatshenshini River (subsequently the Blanchard River).  These headwaters are along the Silver Lake Trail (one of the Chilkat trade routes between Haines and Hutshi Lake, Yukon), 100 trail-miles from Haines. In 1891, the name Tatshenshini was re-assigned to a different river. Pre-1891 Tatshenshini River (subsequently the Blanchard River) located at Haines Highway Kilometer 144.8. Post-1891 Tatshenshini River located 5 kilometers west of Haines Highway Kilometer 164, via Dalton Post Road.

Teslin [Car #242] was derived from the Northern Tutchone phrase dé-lin, which means flowing out. Teslin Lake extends between Alaska Highway kilometers 1244 and 1290.

"Thompson River" [Car #334] is the un-official name of the stream flowing from Meadows (Mile Post 25.4 Station) to Bernard Lake (at Mile Post 28.3). Received the name "Thompson River" by 1899. Most likely, named for Livingston Thompson (1851-1904), surveyor and Secretary of the Bennett Lake & Klondyke Navigation Co. Thompson was also a friend of William J. Rant, the British Columbia agent, magistrate, and assistant land commissioner for Bennett in 1898. The official name of this stream is Tutshi River.

Tincup Lake [Car #508] most likely a fantasy name for the unnamed lake on Montana Mountain, from which Tincup Creek flows. Lake located 0.9 kilometer west of Montana Mountain Access Road Kilometer 4.7, via a trail.  (There is another Tincup Lake at a remote location north of Kluane Lake.)

Tutshi [Car #260] was derived from the Tlingit metaphor t’ooch’ áayi, which literally means charcoal lake, and figuratively means dark lake. Tutshi Lake is darker than most lakes in the region because it is not fed by glacial runoff. Lake extends between Klondike Highway kilometers 57 and 70.

Utah [former Mile Post 105.5 Station] was the site of a camp of the Utah Construction Co. during construction of the Alaska Highway.  Utah also located at Alaska Highway kilometer 1415.7.

Viaduct [Mile Post 5.9 Station] had been named for the East Fork Bridge, now Bridge 5-A. Station renamed to Denver in 1904.

Vista [Mile Post 36.1 Station] was named for the view from this location.  Station had been named Barry until 2007 or 2008.

Wasson Lake [Car #368] was named for Everett L. Wasson (1910–1958), first bush pilot in the Yukon.

Watson [Mile Post 59.4 Station] was named for Thomas J. Watson (1861-1926) of Watson & Church, Skagway real estate agents during 1898-1899.

Watson Lake [Cars ##238, 502] was named for Francis G. "Frank" Watson (1883–1939), a Klondike stampeder.  Lake located at Alaska Highway kilometer 980.

Wette Lea [former Mile Post 83.7 Station] was named for Auguste C. R. de Wette (1845-1912), banker and early shareholder of the WP&YR. Station renamed to De Wette in 1901.

White Pass [Mile Post 20.4 Station] was named for the Hon. Thomas W. White (1830-1888), Canadian Interior Minister, 1885-1888.

Whitehorse [former Mile Post 110.7 Station] was named for the appearance of rapids in the Yukon River, about two miles upstream from the railroad station. Since 1958, these rapids have been covered by Schwatka Lake. Until 1957, the city's name was spelled as two words: "White Horse."  Whitehorse also located at Alaska Highway kilometer 1429.

Whiting River [Car #378] was named for U.S. Navy Surgeon Robert Whiting (1847–1897).  River flows into Gilbert Bay, 33 nautical miles southeast of Juneau, via Stephens Passage.

Wigan [former Mile Post 104.8 Station] was named for Edward A. Wigan (1868-1942), early shareholder of the WP&YR.

Wolf Lake [Car #502] is a translation of the lake’s Tlingit name Gooch Áayi.

Yukon [Car #290], or Ųųg Han, is a contraction of the words in the Gwich'in phrase chųų gąįį han, which mean white water river and which refer to "the pale colour" of glacial runoff in the Yukon River. The contraction is Ųųg Han, if the \ųų\ remains nasalized, or Yuk Han, if there is no vowel nasalization.  In the 1840s, different tribes had different opinions as to the literal meaning of Yukon. In 1843, the Holikachuks had told the Russian-American Company that their name for the river was Yukkhana and that this name meant "big river." However, Yukkhana does not literally correspond to a Holikachuk phrase that means big river.  Then, two years later, the Gwich'ins told the Hudson's Bay Company that their name for the river was Yukon and that the name meant white water river. White water river in fact corresponds to Gwich'in words that can be shortened to form Yukon. Because the Holikachuks had been trading regularly with both the Gwich'ins and the Yup'iks, the Holikachuks were in a position to borrow the Gwich'in contraction and to conflate its meaning with the meaning of Kuig-pak [River-big], which is the Yup'ik name for the same river.  For that reason, the documentary evidence suggests that the Holikachuks had borrowed the contraction Ųųg Han [White Water River] from Gwich'in, and erroneously assumed that this contraction had the same literal meaning as the corresponding Yup'ik name Kuig-pak [River-big]. Yukon River begins at the foot of Marsh Lake, 1½ kilometers south of Alaska Highway Kilometer 1383.

See also
For the complete roster of White Pass boats, see, List of steamboats on the Yukon River.

For the complete roster of White Pass winter stages, see, Overland Trail (Yukon).

References and notes

Notes on Aboriginal Place Names

It is common for aboriginal place names to remain in English. Cruikshank, Julie (1990) "Getting the Words Right: Perspectives on Naming and Places in Athapaskan Oral History." 27 Arctic Anthropology (No. 1) 52, 63. ("[2] Names can persist. Place names ... are words which can be isolated, recorded, understood and learned by a non-speaker of the language and they can remain in English versions ..."). However, in order to represent aboriginal place names in writing, the pronunciations of these names had to be conformed to English phonology. The aboriginal languages had no written alphabet. Glave, Edward J. (1892). Furthermore, they had about 12 sounds that do not occur in English. Therefore, there were no symbols which corresponded to these non-English sounds. If the aboriginal place names were to be preserved in writing, the pronunciations had to be conformed to English sounds.

An example of a sound which does not occur in English is the initial consonant in the word Tlingit. It is a lateral sound, which means that it is made to the side of the tongue. Begin by holding the tip of the tongue against the roof of the mouth, as you would when you begin to pronounce a \d\ or \t\ sound. Then drop a side of the tongue and, instead, make a \thl\ sound on that side.

In addition, aboriginal place names usually describe some attribute of the place. See, Cruikshank (1990) "Getting the Words Right," at page 63 ("[3] Names provide a unique way of encoding information. Many of the names reflect changes in landscape or in movements of plants and animals."). Attributive place names were needed as a tool to guide the traveler. See, at page 25. The aboriginal traveler had to commit to memory only an attribute of a place, and no additional arbitrary name.  This was of assistance, because the aboriginal languages had not been reduced to writing prior to the arrival of the English or Russian language.

As a consequence of having access only to information that could be remembered, people in the pre-1900 aboriginal societies had to deal with the world quite differently from people today.

External links

Official company website
White Pass Fan Website by Boerries Burkhardt

Narrow gauge railroads in Alaska
Narrow gauge railways in British Columbia
Narrow gauge railways in Yukon